Boggabri is a small town in north-eastern New South Wales, Australia. It is part of Narrabri Shire and lies between Gunnedah and Narrabri on the Kamilaroi Highway.

Boggabri comes from Gamilaraay bagaaybaraay, literally "having creeks". It is likely a reference to the Namoi River, which passes through Boggabri.

Boggabri's main tourist attraction is Gin's Leap. Its name derives from the story of an Aboriginal girl who was promised to an elder of her tribe, the Kamilaroi, and ran away with a young man from a neighbouring tribe. The couple were pursued and, seeing no escape, jumped from the cliff to their deaths.

The water cascades down into a rock pool below after good rain creating a local waterfall.

There are two primary schools in Boggabri: Boggabri Public School and Sacred Heart Primary School.

The town is also home to the Boggabri John Prior Health Service and Prior House Frail Aged Care Home, both named after resident Dr John Prior OAM (1922–2014), who served as the community's sole doctor for half a century and is believed to be New South Wales' longest serving GP.

Boggabri railway station is situated on the Mungindi line, 515 km from Sydney. The station opened in 1882 consists of a station building on a single side platform, a passing loop and small goods yard. Currently a single daily Xplorer diesel railmotor operating between Sydney and Moree serves the station.

The churchman Roland St John MBE and his barrister brother Edward St John QC MP were born at Boggabri when their father was Anglican rector there.

In 1946, Boggabri's rugby league club player, Trevor Eather, was selected to play for the Australian national team. The local team is the Boggabri Kangaroos.

Mahla Pearlman AO (2 June 1937 – 2 December 2011) was the first woman to become chief judge of any jurisdiction within the NSW legal system. She was born at Boggabri to a local farming family, the Pearlmans. Her grandfather Abraham Pearlman had come to Boggabri as a shopkeeper, becoming a farmer in 1905 on the acquisition of the property Herzlton.

Population
According to the 2016 census of population, there were 856 people in Boggabri.
 Aboriginal and Torres Strait Islander people made up 13.2% of the population. 
 85.6% of people were born in Australia and 87.5% of people spoke only English at home. 
 The most common responses for religion were Anglican 34.0%, No Religion 21.8% and Catholic 18.8%.

References

External links

Boggabri Information Guide
Kamilaroi Highway
Visit Narrabri
Boggabri website and directory
Boggabri Business Chamber

Towns in New South Wales
North West Slopes
Narrabri Shire